The South Boston Wrappers was the final and primary moniker of the minor league baseball teams based in South Boston, Virginia. South Boston teams played as members of the Class D level Bi-State League from 1937 to 1940, hosting home games at Fairgrounds Park. South Boston was an affiliate of the Boston Bees (Braves) in 1937.

History 
The South Boston Twins began minor league play as charter members of the 1937 Class D level Bi-State League as an affiliate of the Boston Bees. The Twins finished their first season of play with a record of 43–68, placing 7th in the eight–team Bi-State League regular season under manager James Shelton. South Boston finished 24.0 games behind the 1st place Bassett Furniture Makers in the final standings.

The South Boston-Halifax Wrappers continued play as members of the 1938 Bi-State League, as the name change also represented the partnership with neighboring Halifax, Virginia. The Wrappers again placed 7th in the standings, ending the 1938 regular season with a record of 43–77 and finishing 35.0 games behind the 1st place Bassett Furniture Makers. The team was managed by James Calleran and John Carey.

The 1939 South Boston Wrappers finished 7th in the Bi-State League for the third consecutive season. With a record of 46–65, South Boston finished 22.5 games behind the 1st place Danville-Schoolfield Leafs, playing under manager Dixie Parker.

In their final season of play, The South Boston Wrappers finished 5th in the 1940 Bi-State League under managers Jack Crosswhite and Allen Mobley. Ending the 1940 regular season with a record of 56–60, South Boston finished 16.5 games behind the pennant winning Bassett Furniture Makers. After the 1940 season the Bi-State League condensed to six teams from eight and the South Boston franchise permanently folded.

The ballpark
South Boston teams were noted to have played minor league home games at Fairgrounds Park. With a capacity of 3,000 in 1939, the ballpark had dimensions of (Left, Center, Right): 310–345–315 in 1939. The ballpark was located on the grounds of the Halifax County Fairgrounds and South Boston Speedway.

Timeline

Year-by-year records

Notable alumni

Joe Burns (1937–1938)
Charlie Fuchs (1938–1939) 
Buster Maynard (1937)
Dave Odom (1940)
Dixie Parker (1939, MGR)
Buck Rogers (1940)
Neb Stewart (1939–1940)

See also
South Boston Twins playersSouth Boston Wrappers players South Boston-Halifax Wrappers players

References

External links
South Boston - Baseball Reference

Defunct minor league baseball teams
Professional baseball teams in Virginia
Defunct baseball teams in Virginia
Baseball teams established in 1939
Baseball teams disestablished in 1940
Bi-State League teams
Halifax County, Virginia